is an ancient and noble Japanese family name.

Minamoto may also refer to:

Noble people with the family name of Minamoto 

 , seventh son of the Japanese Emperor Saga
 , Japanese poet and statesman, son of Emperor Saga of Japan
 , Japanese court official during the Heian period and son of Emperor Montoku of Japan
 , early Heian waka poet and Japanese nobleman, also known as 
 , Japanese waka poet of the mid-Heian period
 , middle Heian waka poet and Japanese nobleman, also known as 
 , birth name of Emperor Daigo of Japan until 887
 , one of Court attendant (Koui) of Emperor Daigo of Japan
 , middle Heian waka poet and Japanese nobleman
 , waka poet and Japanese nobleman active in the Heian period
 , Japanese mid Heian waka poet, scholar and nobleman, decendant of Emperor Saga of Japan
 , Japanese nobleman and gagaku musician in the Heian period
 , early Heian waka poet and Japanese nobleman
 , Japanese noble and a scholar of ancient Japan, also known as 
 , Japanese samurai and Imperial Prince during Heian period
 , Japanese samurai and court official of the Heian period
 , Japanese samurai served the regents of the Fujiwara clan along with his brother Yorinobu
 , Japanese samurai commander and member of the powerful Minamoto clan
 , Japanese samurai, companion of Minamoto no Yorimitsu, also known as Watanabe no Tsuna
 , Japanese samurai lord and the Chinjufu-shōgun head of the Minamoto clan
 , prominent Japanese poet whose works appeared in various anthologies
 , important and innovative Japanese poet, who compiled the Gosen Wakashū
 , Japanese nobleman and waka poet in the Heian period
 , Japanese samurai in the Battle of Uji in 1180 during that part of Genpei War
 , Japanese samurai in the Battle of Uji in 1180 during that part of Genpei War
 , Japanese samurai and the Chinjufu-shōgun head of the Minamoto clan
 , Japanese samurai of the Minamoto clan
 ,  Japanese samurai and head of the Minamoto clan during his lifetime
 , Japanese samurai lord during the Heian period
 , Japanese samurai warlord of the late Heian period, founder of the Takeda Clan (武田氏) of Japan
 , Japanese samurai who first implored the spirit of the Iwashimizu Shrine 
 , Japanese progenitor of the Nitta branch family of the Minamoto clan
 , Japanese samurai, founder of the Ashikaga clan of Japan (also known as Ashikaga Yoshiyasu (足利 義康))
 , Japanese general of the late Heian period and head of the Minamoto clan
 , Japanese samurai who fought in the Hōgen Rebellion of 1156
 , brother of Minamoto no Yoshitomo, and commanders in the Genpei War
 , Japanese samurai lord in the late Heian period
 , Japanese samurai of the Minamoto clan
 , Japanese samurai of the Minamoto clan of the late Heian period
 , Japanese samurai, founder and the first shogun of the Kamakura shogunate of Japan
 , Japanese general during late Heian period of the Minamoto clan
 , Japanese commander of the Minamoto clan in the late Heian and early Kamakura periods
 , son of Emperor Go-Shirakawa of Japan, also known as Prince Mochihito
 , Japanese governor in Kawachi province
 , waka poet and Japanese nobleman active in the early Kamakura period
 , waka poet and Japanese nobleman active in the early Kamakura period
 , third shōgun of the Kamakura shogunate of Japan
 , eldest son of the 2nd Kamakura shōgun Minamoto no Yoriie.
 , daughter of Kitabatake Morochika, and Imperial consort to Emperor Go-Daigo of Japan
 , Japanese technology entrepreneur and real estate investor
 , Japanese sport shooter
 , former Japanese freestyle swimmer

Others 

 Minamoto clan, one of four great clans in history of Japan that dominated Japanese politics during the Heian period

 Fictional characters:
 , smart, kind and pretty girl in a famous Japanese manga and anime of Doraemon
 , high school girl and aspiring idol in an anime television series of Zombie Land Saga
 , fellow school student who resides in the Shimazu dorm in a Japanese visual novel of Maji de Watashi ni Koi Shinasai!

References 

Japanese names
Japanese people
Japanese clans
Japan
Surnames
Minamoto clan